The 3rd National Television Awards ceremony was held at the Royal Albert Hall on 8 October 1997 and was hosted by Trevor McDonald.

Awards

References

National Television Awards
National Television Awards
National Television Awards
1997 in London
National Television Awards
National Television Awards